Irma Benčić was a Croat partisan and anti-fascist. She was active in the Istrian resistance movement against an occupying German army during World War II. Benčić was killed in March 1945 by the Germans; her efforts to liberate Istra are commemorated by a memorial park in her name.

Biography 
Irma Benčić was a native of Istria Province, part of modern-day Croatia; during Irma's lifetime, the province was part of Yugoslavia. When Nazi Germany invaded Yugoslavia in 1940, a resistance movement, later widely referred to as the NOP (hr), was formed in Istria to oppose the German occupiers of the Operational Zone of the Adriatic Littoral. Benčić joined the partisans during the conflict, actively resisting against the Germans. She was killed by the German army on the night of 1 March 1945 in Novigrad, two months before the city was liberated by the advancing Yugoslav army.

References 

1945 deaths
Croatian rebels
Year of birth unknown
Female resistance members of World War II
Yugoslav Partisans members
Resistance members killed by Nazi Germany
Croatian civilians killed in World War II